In microeconomics, economies of density are cost savings resulting from spatial proximity of suppliers or providers. Typically higher population densities allow synergies in service provision leading to lower unit costs. If large economies of density exist there is an incentive for firms to concentrate and agglomerate.

Typical examples are found in logistic systems where the distribution or collection of goods is needed, such as solid waste management. Delivering, for instance, mail in an area with many postboxes results in overall cost savings and thus lower delivery costs. 

Different network infrastructures such as electricity or gas networks show as well economies of density.

Economies of density are not to be confused with economies of scale where unit costs are not linked to spatial properties.

See also
 Economies of scale
 Economies of scope
 Network effects
 Economies of agglomeration

References 

Regional economics
Economics effects